In music and music theory, a polychord consists of two or more chords, one on top of the other. In shorthand they are written with the top chord above a line and the bottom chord below, for example F upon C: .

The use of polychords may suggest bitonality or polytonality. Harmonic parallelism may suggest bichords.

Examples may be found in Igor Stravinsky's Petrushka, p. 15, and Rite of Spring, "Dance of the Adolescents" (1921)  (see Petrushka chord).

In the polychords in the image above, the first might suggest a thirteenth chord, the second may suggest a D minor ninth chord with upper extensions, but the octave separation of the 3rd makes the suggestion of two independent triads a minor ninth apart even more likely, and the fourth is a split-third chord.

Extended chords contain more than one triad, and so can be regarded as a type of polychord:

(C ≡ D)

The Lydian augmented scale, "has a polychord sound built in," created by superimposing the Caug and the E and/or Fdim triads that exist in the scale, this being, "a very common practice for most bop and post-bop players [such as McCoy Tyner]."

Examples of extended chords include the Elektra chord.

When one or both of the chords in a polychord are not "chords" in some exclusive sense according to some preferred chord theory or other, polychords devolves into chordioid technique.

See also
 Secundal
 Tertian
 Quartal
 Upper structure
 Chordioid

References

Chords
Post-tonal music theory